Ohyun Kwon is a Korean-American chemist who is a professor at the University of California, Los Angeles. Her research considers new methodologies for organic transformations and the development of chiral catalysts.

Early life and education 
Kwon was born in South Korea. She attended the Seoul National University, where she majored in chemistry. She moved to the United States for graduate studies, first joining Columbia University to work in the research group of Samuel J. Danishefsky. Her doctorate considered the synthesis of glycolipid Ganglio-N-tetraosylceramide (asialo GM1). Afterwards, Kwon moved to Harvard University as a postdoctoral fellow in the laboratory of Stuart Schreiber, where she worked on a diversity oriented synthesis of macrocycles and multi-cyclic compounds.

Research and career 
Kwon was appointed to the faculty at the University of California, Los Angeles (UCLA) in 2001. Her research considers the development of chiral catalysts, target-oriented synthesis of natural compounds and diversity oriented synthesis of natural-product like molecules. She has explored the activation of the C(sp3)–C(sp2) bond of alkenes that is common in natural products. These can be used for the generation of biologically relevant molecules and total synthesis. Kwon developed organic, phosphine-based catalysts for chemical reactions. She has shown that phosphine-catalysed alleviate annulations can be used to create natural products of medical significance. 

Kwon showed that chiral phosphines can be used for asymmetric catalysis, including DIPAMP, DIOP and BINAP. These phosphines include stereogenic phosphorus centres, axial chirality and stereogenic carbon centres. Kwon developed a family of phosphines with stereogenic carbon and phosphorus centres that are available from Sigma-Aldrich.

Awards and honors 
 2018 University of California Center for Accelerated Innovation Technology Development Grant 
 2019 Novartis Chemistry Lectureship Award
 2019 Herbert Newby McCoy Award

Selected publications

References 

Living people
Year of birth missing (living people)
University of California, Los Angeles faculty
Seoul National University alumni
Columbia University alumni
American chemists